About You may refer to:

 About You (company), a German fashion online retailer
 "About You" (Shane Filan song), 2013
 "About You", a song by Paul McCartney from his 2001 album Driving Rain
 "About You", a song by Mike Shinoda from his 2018 album Post Traumatic
 "About You", a song by Caravan Palace from the 2019 album Chronologic
 "About You", a song by G Flip from her 2019 album About Us
 "About You", a song by Ayumi Hamasaki from her 2004 album My Story
 "About You", a song by Greta from their 1995 album This Is Greta
 "About You...", a song by Ami Suzuki released as a B-side to her 2005 single "Delightful"
 "About You" (No Songs Left to Sing)
 "About You" (Trey Songz song)
 "About You" (MacKenzie Porter song)

See also
All About You (disambiguation)
Everything About You (disambiguation)
How About You (disambiguation)
Mad About You (disambiguation)
Something About You (disambiguation)
Thinking About You (disambiguation)
What I Like About You (disambiguation)